The High Temple is an ancient Mayan temple at the Lamanai archaeological site in Orange Walk District, Belize. 

The High Temple's highest exposed height of  cannot be climbed even in the presence of a tour guide, due to an incident in which a woman was hospitalized with a severe spinal fracture, leaving her unable to walk. The view from the top allows the climber to see over the jungle and to see a large portion of the New River lagoon.  The Temple itself is believed to date back over 2000 years and was used as a religious platform for the local tribes to gather.

See also
Maya ruins of Belize
Pre-Columbian Belize
List of tallest structures built before the 20th century

Lamanai High
Maya architecture
Pyramids in Belize